Rodolfo Viganò (born 25 January 1971) is an Italian sports shooter. He competed in the men's trap event at the 2000 Summer Olympics.

References

1971 births
Living people
Italian male sport shooters
Olympic shooters of Italy
Shooters at the 2000 Summer Olympics
Sportspeople from Milan